Gregg Johnson (born June 18, 1982 in Windsor, Connecticut) is an American former professional ice hockey forward.

Playing career
Johnson's amateur career began in the Eastern Junior Hockey League, where he skated with the New England Jr. Coyotes from 1997 to 2000, earning 202 points in combined goals and assists.  The Jr. Coyotes won the Gary Dineen Cup twice during Johnson's tenure there, once in 1998 and again in 2000.

Johnson played college hockey at Boston University from 2000 to 2004, scoring a combined 47 points in goals and assists during regular season play.

In 2001, Johnson was picked by the Ottawa Senators in the eighth round of the NHL draft.  He elected to remain at Boston University, and would not join the Senators organization until 2003, when he moved to their AHL affiliate, the Binghamton Senators.

Johnson skated with the Binghamton Senators from 2003 to 2006, earning 49 points in combined goals and assists during regular season play.  Johnson spent the majority of the 2004–05 season with the Pee Dee Pride, the Senators' ECHL affiliate, where he scored 63 points in goals and assists during the regular season.
 
Johnson split the 2006–07 season between the Trenton Titans (ECHL), where he scored 31 points in goals and assists during 26 games; the Bridgeport Sound Tigers (AHL), scoring 13 points in 35 games; and the Norfolk Admirals (AHL), where he scored 3 points in 11 games.

In 2007, Johnson left the AHL after only 12 games with the Bridgeport Sound Tigers.  He moved to Europe, where he played 9 games with SaiPa of SM-liiga and 7 games with the Frankfurt Lions of the DEL.  Johnson then signed with Frankfurt's league rivals, the Grizzly Adams Wolfsburg for the 2008–09 season, where he scored 7 points in the regular season and 3 points during post-season play.

Johnson returned to the ECHL in 2009, joining the South Carolina Stingrays' roster.  In January 2010, Johnson was selected to represent the Stingrays as an alternate captain for all road games.

Johnson did not return to the Stingrays for the 2010–11 season and eventually retired.

Awards
Named EJHL Rookie of the Year in 1998
Named EJHL MVP in 2000

Career statistics

Regular season and playoffs

International

References

External links

1982 births
American men's ice hockey forwards
Binghamton Senators players
Boston University Terriers men's ice hockey players
Bridgeport Sound Tigers players
Frankfurt Lions players
Living people
Norfolk Admirals players
Pee Dee Pride players
People from Windsor, Connecticut
SaiPa players
South Carolina Stingrays players
Trenton Titans players
Grizzlys Wolfsburg players
Ice hockey players from Connecticut
Ottawa Senators draft picks